10th Cavalry Brigade may refer to:

 10th Cavalry Brigade (British Indian Army) of the British Indian Army in the First World War, distinct from the one below
 10th Indian Cavalry Brigade of the British Indian Army in the First World War, distinct from the one above
 10th Motorized Cavalry Brigade (Poland) of the pre- and early-World War II Polish Army
 10th Armoured Cavalry Brigade (Poland) of the Polish Armed Forces in the West in World War II

See also
 10th Brigade (disambiguation)